In climatology, the Coupled Model Intercomparison Project (CMIP) is a collaborative framework designed to improve knowledge of climate change. It was organized in 1995 by the Working Group on Coupled Modelling (WGCM) of the World Climate Research Programme (WCRP). It is developed in phases to foster the climate model improvements but also to support national and international assessments of climate change. A related project is the Atmospheric Model Intercomparison Project (AMIP) for global coupled ocean-atmosphere general circulation models (GCMs).

Coupled models are computer-based models of the earth's climate, in which different parts (such as atmosphere, oceans, land, ice) are "coupled" together, and interact in simulations.

CMIP phases 

The Program for Climate Model Diagnosis and Intercomparison (PCMDI) at Lawrence Livermore National Laboratory has been supporting the several CMIP phases by helping WGCM to determine the scope of the project, by maintaining the project's data base and by participating in data analysis. CMIP has received model output from the pre-industrial climate simulations ("control runs") and 1% per year increasing-CO2 simulations of about 30 coupled GCMs. More recent phases of the project (20C3M, ...) include more realistic scenarios of climate forcing for both historical, paleoclimate and future scenarios.

CMIP Phases 1 and 2 
The response to the CMIP1 announcement was very successful and up to 18 global coupled models participated in the data collection representing most of the international groups with global coupled GCMs. In consequence, at the September 1996 meeting of CLIVAR NEG2 in Victoria, Canada, it was decided that CMIP2 will be an inter-comparison of 1% per year compound  increase integrations (80 years in length) where  doubles at around year 70.

CMIP Phase 3 
During 2005 and 2006, a collection of climate model outputs was coordinated and stored by PCMDI. The climate model outputs included simulations of past, present and future climate scenarios. This activity enabled those climate models, outside the major modeling centers to perform research of relevance to climate scientists preparing the IPCC Fourth Assessment Report (IPCC-AR4). For the CMIP3 a list of 20 different experiments were proposed, and the PCMDI kept the  documentation of all the global climate model involved. Additional information and data-sets are in.

CMIP Phase 5 
The next phase of the project (2010-2014) was CMIP5. CMIP5 included more metadata describing model simulations than previous phases. The METAFOR project created an exhaustive schema describing the scientific, technical, and numerical aspects of CMIP runs which was archived along with the output data.

A main objective of the CMIP5 experiments was to address outstanding scientific questions that arose as part of the IPCC AR4 process, improve understanding of climate, and to provide estimates of future climate change that will be useful to those considering its possible consequences. The IPCC Fifth Assessment Report summarizes information of CMIP5 experiments, while the CMIP5 experimental protocol was endorsed by the 12th Session of the WCRP Working on  this Group on Coupled Modelling (WGCM). Additional information and data-sets are in.

CMIP Phase 6 

Planning meetings for Phase 6 began in 2013, and an overview of the design and organization was published in 2016. By 2018 CMIP6 had endorsed 23 Model Intercomparison Projects (MIPs) involving 33 modeling groups in 16 countries. A small number of common experiments were also planned. The deadline for submission of papers to contribute to the IPCC 6th Assessment Report Working Group I is early 2020.

The structure of the CMIP6 has been extended with respect to CMIP5 by providing an equivalent framework named CMIP Diagnostic, Evaluation and Characterization of Klima (DECK) (klima is Greek for "climate"), together with a set of Endorsed MIPs   to improve the description of aspects of climate models beyond the core set of common experiments included in DECK. However, CMIP-Endorsed Model Intercomparison Projects (MIPs) are still built on the DECK and CMIP historical simulations, therefore their main goal is just to address a wider range of specific questions. This structure will be kept in future CMIP experiments.

CMIP6 also aims to be consistent regarding common standards and documentation. To achieve that it includes methods to facilitate a wider distribution and characterization of model outputs, and common standard tools for their analyses. A number of guides has been created for data managers, modelers and users.

A set of official/common forcings datasets are available for the studies under DECK, as well as several MIPS. That allows for more sensible comparisons on the model ensemble created under the CMIP6 umbrella.

These common dataset forcings are stored and coordinated by input4MIPS (input datasets for Model Intercomparison Projects). Most of them are freely available here.

 Historical Short-Lived Climate Forcers (SLCF) and greenhouse gas ( and CH4) Emissions
 Biomass Burning Emissions
 Global Gridded Land-use Forcing Datasets: data are available here
 Historical greenhouse gases concentrations: a full description is published  via the CMIP6 Special Issue publication
 Ozone Concentrations and Nitrogen (N)-Deposition: additional information here, while the description of ozone radiative forcing based on this dataset is published.
 Aerosol Optical Properties and Relative Change in Cloud Droplet Number Concentration: Data are available as supplement to Stevens et al. (2016) here
 Solar Forcing: Datasets are available here and the description published 
Stratospheric Aerosol Data Set: data are available here
AMIP Sea Surface Temperature and Sea Ice Datasets

Beyond these historical forcings, CMIP6 also has a common set of future scenarios comprising land use and emissions as required for the future Shared Socio-Economic Pathways (SSPs) which have replaced the  Representative Concentration Pathways (RCPs) from prior models.

See also 
 Climate model
 Intergovernmental Panel on Climate Change
 Representative Concentration Pathway
 Shared Socioeconomic Pathways

References

External links 
 Coupled Model Intercomparison Project (CMIP)
  An Overview of Results from the Coupled Model Intercomparison Project (CMIP)
 MIPS Overview, included CMIP1 to CMIP5 phases
 CMIP5 Summary
 CMIP5 Design Documents
 CMIP6 homepage (WCRP)
 CMIP Related Publications

Numerical climate and weather models